Yeruslan is a river Saratov Oblast and Volgograd Oblast, Russia, a left tributary of the Volga. It springs from the south-western slope of the Obshchy Syrt and flows to the Yeruslan Cove of the Volgograd Reservoir. Yeruslan has the left inflow Solyonaya Kuba. Its former left tributary Torgun currently flows to the Yeruslan Cove. The town of Krasny Kut is located alongside the Yeruslan.

At summer Yeruslan dries up and in some places has salty water.

References 

Rivers of Saratov Oblast
Rivers of Volgograd Oblast